The Hero is a  1923 American silent drama film directed by Louis J. Gasnier and starring Gaston Glass, Barbara La Marr, and John St. Polis. It is based upon the 1921 play of the same name by Gilbert Emery.

Cast
 Gaston Glass as Oswald Lane 
 Barbara La Marr as Hester Lane 
 John St. Polis as Andrew Lane 
 Martha Mattox as Sarah Lane 
 Frankie Lee as Andy Lane 
 David Butler as Bill Walters 
 Doris Pawn as Martha 
 Ethel Shannon as Hilda Pierce 
 Miriam Cooper as Martha Baker
 Grace Darmond

Preservation
The Hero is a lost film.

References

Bibliography
 Munden, Kenneth White. The American Film Institute Catalog of Motion Pictures Produced in the United States, Part 1. University of California Press, 1997.

External links

1923 films
1923 drama films
American silent feature films
American black-and-white films
Silent American drama films
Lost American films
Films directed by Louis J. Gasnier
1920s English-language films
Films with screenplays by Barbara La Marr
1923 lost films
Lost drama films
Preferred Pictures films
1920s American films